Berglimattsee is a lake in the protected area Freiberg Kärpf on municipal territory of Glarus Süd in the Swiss canton of Glarus.

To the north are the two peaks of the Gandstock, to the south the Charenstock. The lake's outflow is a tributary of the Niderenbach, which flows further into the Sernf.

Access 
 From the west: Berglimattsee can be reached via a mountain hiking trail from Mettmenalp (mountain station of the cable car Kies-Mettmen) at Garichtisee in about 1.5 hours (550 m altitude difference).
 From the east: the ascent from Engi or Matt in the Sernftal takes about 4 hours (1300 m elevation gain).

Flora and fauna 
The lake is rich in small animals (e.g. rotifers) and algae, as well as alpine newts in summer. Fish, on the other hand, do not exist, probably because the lake partially freezes to the bottom in winter.

References 

Lakes of the canton of Glarus